Södra Sofielund is a neighbourhood of Malmö, situated in the Borough of Södra Innerstaden, Malmö Municipality, Skåne County, Sweden. In 2015, the area was reported by daily newspaper Sydsvenskan to be a socially deprived area where drugs were sold openly and heavy violence involving the use of hand grenades and assault rifles occurred.

In the 2011–13 period, about 35% of the population originated outside the EU and the Nordic countries.
 	
In its December 2015 report, Police in Sweden placed the district in the most severe category of urban areas with high crime rates.

References

Neighbourhoods of Malmö